General elections were held in the Solomon Islands on 6 August 1980. They were the first since independence has been achieved two years earlier. The Solomon Islands United Party led by Prime Minister Peter Kenilorea emerged as the largest party, winning 16 of the 38 seats. Following the elections, Kenilorea was re-elected Prime Minister.

Campaign
A total of 244 candidates contested the 38 seats.

Results
Around two-thirds of incumbent MPs lost their seats.

The election result in West Honiara was annulled by the Electoral Commission after the High Court ruled that the winning candidate Ben Gale had committed electoral offences. The by-election was held in August 1981 and was won by Gordon Billy Gatu of the National Democratic Party who received 681 votes to the 290 for Frank Saemala of the SIUP and 245 for Lilly Ogatina Poznanski, who ran as an independent.

Aftermath
Following the elections Kenilorea was re-elected Prime Minister, defeating People's Alliance Party leader Solomon Mamaloni by 25 votes to 5. He formed a government with the support of a group of independents led by Francis Billy Hilly, who became Deputy Prime Minister.

References

Solomons
General
Elections in the Solomon Islands
Election and referendum articles with incomplete results